How's About It is a 1943 musical film starring The Andrews Sisters.

Plot

Cast
 The Andrews Sisters as Themselves
 Grace McDonald as Marion Bliss
 Robert Paige as George Selby
 Shemp Howard as Alf
 Buddy Rich as Orchestra Leader

Production
The film was known during production as I Want to Dance, then Solid Senders.

References

External links

American musical films
1943 films
1943 musical films
American black-and-white films
Universal Pictures films
Films directed by Erle C. Kenton
1940s American films